The 1955 Tourist Trophy may refer to the following races:
 The 1955 Isle of Man TT, for Grand Prix Motorcycles
 The 1955 RAC Tourist Trophy, for sports cars held at Dundrod
 The 1955 Dutch TT, for Grand Prix Motorcycles held at Assen